KWOA (730 AM) is a radio station located in Worthington, Minnesota, United States, which broadcasts a sports format.

History
KWOA has had several formats over the years. It was an MOR-formatted station after television signals reached the areas, which its network covered. During the most of 1970s, the station had a country format but since the mid-1980s, it has shifted to a talk format. In April 2013, its transmitting tower was toppled by a blizzard. However, the station continued transmitting using a longwire antenna to provide storm-related information to its listeners.

On August 14, 2017 KWOA changed their format from talk to sports, branded as "The Fan 730".

References

External links
The Fan 730 & 100.3 Online

Sports radio stations in the United States
Radio stations in Minnesota
Radio stations established in 1947
1947 establishments in Minnesota